Video magnifiers are electronic devices that use a camera and a display screen to perform digital magnification of printed materials. The display screen is usually LCD or a similar flat-screen technology (although older video magnifiers have used CRT displays), and the device usually includes a lamp to illuminate the source material. Video magnifiers are designed to be mostly used by people with low vision that cannot be helped using a conventional magnifying glass.

Advantages

Magnification range and display size
The main benefit of a video magnifier over purely optical magnification is that the video magnifier allows greater magnification across a larger field of view. With optical lenses, the field of meaningful, in-focus view is reduced with increased magnification. A video magnifier however is limited only by its display size and its electronics; video magnifiers that can be switched between 2 and 50 times magnification are common, and displays can range from smartphone-sized to TV-sized.

Image processing
Most video magnifiers can automatically focus the image, and the more advanced models are capable of further electronic image processing to change the colours, enhance the contrast, and/or assist in the tracking of images. Some can be set to save "snapshots" of previously seen images.

Disadvantages

Power requirements
Video magnifiers require power, either via mains electricity or from a battery. This may make battery life an issue if the magnifier is required for an extended period of time away from power, whereas a purely optical magnification device could be used indefinitely without needing to be connected to power.

Non-portability of the larger models
Very large video magnifiers are not typically portable, but they can still be used in home installations, libraries and classrooms. Some of these models are informally referred to as CCTV magnifiers.

Pricing
As of 2013, video magnifiers are typically several times more expensive than optical-only magnifiers.

Software video magnifiers
Due to the high cost of dedicated-hardware video magnifiers, there has been some interest in software video magnification running on smartphones such as iPhone and Android, tablets such as iPad, and laptops with suitably-mounted camera peripherals. Software magnifiers might not achieve the same quality as a good hardware video magnifier, and if used extensively they might exhaust the battery quickly, but if the user already has a smartphone, tablet or laptop then software magnification can be more economical than obtaining a separate hardware video magnifier.

References

Magnifiers
Assistive technology